Kalpienung is a locality in Victoria, Australia, located approximately 35 km from Wycheproof, Victoria.

Kalpienung Post Office opened on 8 November 1890 and closed in 1941.

References

Towns in Victoria (Australia)